This is about the ice hockey player. For the racing driver, see Ronnie Peterson.

Ronnie Pettersson (born March 6, 1971) is a retired Swedish professional ice hockey player. Pettersson mostly played with Djurgårdens IF in the Swedish Elitserien and Huddinge IK in the lower divisions.

Career statistics

External links

References 

1971 births
Swedish ice hockey defencemen
Djurgårdens IF Hockey players
Living people
Huddinge IK players